The 2022 UK Music Video Awards were held on 27 October 2022, at Magazine London in London and hosted by  Spencer Jones, to recognise the best in music videos and music film making from United Kingdom and worldwide. This marks the first change in venue for the awards since the 2015 edition, from 2015 to 2021, the awards ceremony was held at the Roundhouse in London, with the exception of the virtual ceremony in 2020.

The nominations were announced on 28 September 2022, FKA twigs received the most nominations with eight, followed by The Weeknd, Obongjayar, Little Simz and black midi with six each. "Cash In Cash Out" by Pharrell Williams featuring 21 Savage and Tyler, the Creator received the most awards with four wins, including Video of the Year.

Video of the Year

Video Genre Categories

Technical and Craft Categories

Special Video Categories

Individual and Company Categories

References

External links
Official website

UK Music Video Awards
British music awards
UK Music Video Awards
UK Music Video Awards
UK Music Video Awards